The Venerable  Edmund Hope  was Archdeacon of Cleveland from 1942 until his death on 24 January 1947

Hope was educated at Keble College, Oxford. He was ordained Deacon in 1901, and Priest in 1902. After  a curacy in  Middlesbrough he held incumbencies at Marske-by-the-Sea, Mexborough and Beverley.

References

Alumni of Keble College, Oxford
Archdeacons of Cleveland
1947 deaths